Who Is Alice is a 2017 British comedy film directed by Robert van den Broek and Ismaël Lotz and starring Ali Bastian, Patrick Holland, Keith Ackerman, and Lee Brace.

Plot 
Alice is a 35 year old actress desperately hanging on to her 'new young thing' career. She is willing to sacrifice almost everything in order to reach the top and this mind-bending story takes us down the rabbit hole with her. Alice meets Dick, a car salesman who is disillusioned with life and dreaming about becoming a spiritual teacher. Together with a renegade cast of misfit characters they hilariously and awkwardly tie themselves in knots as they find their 'way'. And where does that 'way' lead them? ... To exactly where they are supposed to be. Who is Alice uses humour guided by the a little non-dual thinking to help us look at ourselves and life in a different way. If the insight strikes, your whole perspective can change, while 'in reality' nothing has to change.

Cast
 Ali Bastian as Alice & Nina
 Patrick Holland as Walter & Dick
 Keith Ackerman as John/Mr. Hanson
 Lee Brace as Martin
 Maurizio Benazzo as Paolo
 David Fahm as Mark
 Robert J. Francis as Leo
 David Wade as Tom
 Naomi Willow as Bridget
 Summer Jade Webber as Anna
 Cally Lawrence as Cally & Sandra
 Lee Lomas as Badrik
 William Sutton as Maharaj
 Jeremiah Flemming as Estate Agent
 Elkie Deadman as Spiritual Teacher

References

External links
 
 

2017 films
2017 comedy films
British comedy films
Films about actors
2010s English-language films
2010s British films